The Finne is a ridge of hills in the German states of Saxony-Anhalt and Thuringia up to  and 23 km long.

Geography 
Together with the Schmücke, the Hohe Schrecke and the Hainleite, the Finne borders the northeastern rim of the Thuringian Basin. It lies between Bad Sulza and Hauteroda.

The Finne Tunnel, which has a total length of 6.885 m and is part of the Erfurt–Leipzig/Halle high-speed railway, passes through the Finne ridge.

Hills 
Künzelsberg 
Seligenbornsberg 
Wendenburg bei Burgwenden 
Buchberg

Nature conservation 
Parts of the Finne have been declared a nature reserve. 

The nature reserve was notified to the European Commission as part of the Hohe Schrecke - Finne Flora-Fauna Habitat Region.

References 

Mountains and hills of Saxony-Anhalt
Hills of Thuringia
Forests and woodlands of Thuringia